Burwick Holm is a small island off the west coast of Mainland, Shetland. It is located in the Bur Wick inlet, and near Scalloway.

Uninhabited islands of Shetland